Dikkers is a surname of English origin, referring to a dike or ditch maker. It appears dating back to 1229. Variations include Dikker, Dicker, Decker, Deeker, Dyker, and Ditcher.

The name is shared by several noted people:

 Manfred Dikkers (born 1971), Dutch drummer
 Scott Dikkers (born 1965), American comedy writer, speaker and entrepreneur
 Sjoera Dikkers (born 1969), Dutch politician

See also
 Dicker (surname)
 Decker (surname)
 Loek Dikker (born 1944), Dutch pianist, conductor, and composer

References